The Words and the Days is an album by Italian jazz trumpeter and composer Enrico Rava recorded in 2005 and released on the ECM label.

Reception
The Allmusic review by Thom Jurek awarded the album 4 stars stating "Once more, Rava dazzles with his grasp of the languages of jazz: its textures, its rhythms, its dynamics and above all, of course, its secretive and inventive melodic improvisation. There is no let down here from Easy Living; The Words and the Days is a worthy companion that confidently stands not in the previous recording's shadow, but on a ledge of its own".

Track listing
All compositions by Enrico Rava except as indicated
 "The Words and the Days" - 4:00 
 "Secrets" - 10:31 
 "The Wind" (Russ Freeman) - 4:44 
 "Echoes of Duke" - 6:36 
 "Tutù" - 7:09 
 "Sogni Proibiti" (Rosario Bonaccorso) - 2:11 
 "Todamor" - 6:37 
 "Serpent" - 9:07 
 "Art Deco" (Don Cherry) - 3:18 
 "Traps" (Roberto Gatto) - 3:25 
 "Bob the Cat" - 5:57 
 "Dr. Ra and Mr. Va" - 9:11 
Recorded at Artesuono Recording Studio in Udine, Italy in December 2005

Personnel
Enrico Rava - trumpet
Gianluca Petrella - trombone
Andrea Pozza - piano
Rosario Bonaccorso - bass
Roberto Gatto - drums

References

ECM Records albums
Enrico Rava albums
2007 albums
Albums produced by Manfred Eicher